WVAH-TV (channel 11) is a television station licensed to Charleston, West Virginia, United States, serving the Charleston–Huntington market as an affiliate of the digital multicast network Decades. It is owned by Cunningham Broadcasting, which maintains a local marketing agreement (LMA) with Sinclair Broadcast Group, owner of dual ABC/Fox affiliate WCHS-TV (channel 8, also licensed to Charleston), for the provision of certain services. However, Sinclair effectively owns WVAH-TV as the majority of Cunningham's stock is owned by the family of deceased group founder Julian Smith. Both stations share studios on Piedmont Road in Charleston, while WVAH-TV's transmitter is located atop Coal Mountain, south of Scott Depot, West Virginia.

History

The station began airing an analog signal on UHF channel 23 on September 19, 1982, with an Elvis Presley movie marathon. It was owned by the newly created Meridian Communications based out of Pittsburgh, which won the license after the West Virginia Legislature forced West Virginia Public Broadcasting to withdraw its own application for the channel. It was the first independent station in West Virginia, as well as the first new commercial station in the market since what is now WOWK-TV (channel 13) signed-on in 1955, and the first commercial UHF station in the state since WKNA-TV in Charleston went off-the-air in 1955. Studios were located on Mount Vernon Road in Teays Valley, an unincorporated area halfway between Huntington and Charleston, though its mailing address said Hurricane (the two areas share a ZIP code). It became a charter Fox affiliate on October 9, 1986. Act III Broadcasting bought the station in 1987, along with WRGT-TV in Dayton, Ohio, from Meridian Communications, in a two-station group deal.

Soon after buying control, Act III applied to move the station to the VHF band. Despite broadcasting from a  tower with the maximum five million watts of power, WVAH had considerable difficulty penetrating the market. The Charleston–Huntington market covers 61 counties in Central West Virginia, Eastern Kentucky, and Southern Ohio. Most of this area is a very rugged dissected plateau, and as a result, UHF stations usually do not get good reception in this kind of terrain. Some areas of the market were among the few where cable television still wasn't available. As a result, WVAH was permitted to switch to VHF channel 11 on April 11, 1988, barely two years after Fox's launch. This marked the first time that any station in the United States signed off as a UHF station, and return to the air as a VHF station. However, the station was short-spaced to WPXI in Pittsburgh and WJHL-TV in Johnson City, Tennessee. It then had to conform its signal to protect WJHL. As a result, it did not provide a clear over-the-air signal to the southwestern part of the market.

Act III merged with Abry Communications in 1994. That company, in turn, was started to Sullivan Broadcasting in 1995 to acquire all of the Act III television stations. In 1997, Sinclair purchased the broadcasting properties of Heritage Media, which included WCHS (the remainder of Heritage Media went to News Corporation). In 1998, Sullivan was then merged with Sinclair Broadcast Group. It could not keep both WCHS and WVAH due to Federal Communications Commission (FCC) rules in effect at the time forbidding duopolies. Sinclair opted to keep the longer-established WCHS and sold WVAH to Glencairn, Ltd. which was headed by former Sinclair executive Edwin Edwards. However, nearly all of Glencairn's stock was held by the Smith family, owners, and founders of Sinclair. In effect, Sinclair still owned WVAH. Sinclair further circumvented the rules by signing a local marketing agreement with Glencairn that allowed it to continue operating WVAH. While WVAH retained its own studios in Teays Valley, most of its operations were merged into WCHS' studios in Charleston.

On January 16, 1995, WVAH began airing UPN programming during overnight hours. However, the station could not clear the entire schedule and dropped the network in early 2000. In 2001, Sinclair tried to acquire Glencairn outright, but the FCC did not allow Sinclair to re-acquire WVAH because it does not allow common ownership of two of the four highest-rated stations in a single market. As a result, Glencairn kept WVAH and changed its name to Cunningham Broadcasting. However, nearly all of Cunningham's stock is controlled by trusts in the name of the Smith family. There is virtually irrefutable evidence that Cunningham is a shell corporation that Sinclair operates to circumvent FCC ownership limits.

Following a tower collapse in 2002, WVAH moved its transmitter and almost all of its facilities to WCHS' studios in Charleston. However, its main studios remained in Teays Valley until late 2009.

On May 15, 2012, Sinclair and Fox agreed to a five-year extension to the network's affiliation agreement with Sinclair's 19 Fox stations, including WVAH-TV, allowing them to continue carrying the network's programming until 2017.

On February 1, 2021, Sinclair moved its Fox affiliation to sister station WCHS-TV on channel 8.2, although it still markets the signal as "Fox 11".  Sinclair did so in several markets to consolidate its affiliations onto stations owned directly by Sinclair rather than with its sidecar divisions. The station began to carry programming from the Decades network.

Carriage dispute
In summer 2006, Charter Communications streamlined its operations which included selling off portions of its cable system which were "geographically non-strategic". Charter accounts in WCHS' market area were purchased by Suddenlink Communications (formerly known as Cebridge). Sinclair requested a $40 million one time fee and a $1 per sub per month fee from Suddenlink for retransmission rights of WVAH and WCHS on the Suddenlink cable system. This led to a protracted media battle and smear campaign between the two companies and Sinclair pulled the two stations off-the-air in the Beckley market. After several weeks of negotiations, the two companies reached an agreement allowing WVAH and WCHS to continue transmission over the Suddenlink cable system. The terms of the agreement were not released to the public.

Newscasts
WCHS currently uses the Eyewitness News branding for its news operation and produces newscasts for sister station WVAH. This includes Eyewitness News This Morning on Fox 11 seen weekday mornings from 6 to 8 a.m., a 6:30 p.m. half-hour newscast weeknights, and an hour-long 10 p.m. newscast every night.

Transition to local HD
WCHS and WVAH started the switch over to high definition in June 2012 by first installing a new HD Master Control room. In July 2012, the station started to remove the set from the studio that was installed in the late 1990s. The old news desk, backdrop, monitors, and the chroma key wall were moved to a small conference room in the station until the transition to HD news was completed. In late July 2012, the new set arrived from Devlin Design Group based out of Crested Butte, Colorado. During the months of August and September, the new set was installed. On September 29, 2012, WCHS and WVAH became the third and fourth stations in the market to launch high definition newscasts.

Technical information

Subchannels
The station's digital signal is multiplexed:

Analog-to-digital conversion
WVAH-TV discontinued regular programming on its analog signal, over VHF channel 11, on February 17, 2009, the original target date in which full-power television stations in the United States were to transition from analog to digital broadcasts under federal mandate (which was later pushed back to June 12, 2009). The station's digital signal remained on its pre-transition UHF channel 19. Through the use of PSIP, digital television receivers display the station's virtual channel as its former VHF analog channel 11.

As part of the SAFER Act, WVAH-TV kept its analog signal on the air until June 26 to inform viewers of the digital television transition through a loop of public service announcements from the National Association of Broadcasters.

See also
Channel 11 virtual TV stations in the United States
Channel 24 digital TV stations in the United States

References

Decades (TV network) affiliates
Stadium (sports network) affiliates
Comet (TV network) affiliates
Charge! (TV network) affiliates
TBD (TV network) affiliates
VAH-TV
Sinclair Broadcast Group
Television channels and stations established in 1982
1982 establishments in West Virginia